Kurt Wiesenfeld is an American physicist working primarily on non-linear dynamics.  His works primarily concern stochastic resonance, spontaneous synchronization of coupled oscillators, and non-linear laser dynamics.  Since 1987, he has been professor of physics at the Georgia Institute of Technology.

Life and work 
Kurt Wiesenfeld received his Bachelor of Science in Physics from the Massachusetts Institute of Technology in 1979, after which he moved to University of California, Berkeley and received his doctorate in 1985.  From 1984 to 1985, he was a Lecturer and Research Scientist at the University of California at Santa Cruz.

In 1987, as a post-doctoral research scientist in the Solid State Theory Group of Brookhaven National Laboratory, he and another fellow post-doctoral scientist, Chao Tang, along with their mentor, Per Bak, presented new ideas in group organization with a concept they coined self-organized criticality in their paper in Physical Review Letters.  The first discovered example of a dynamical system displaying such self-organized criticality was named after them as the Bak–Tang–Wiesenfeld "sandpile" model.

Wiesenfeld is currently a fellow of the American Physical Society, a member of the Society for Industrial and Applied Mathematics (SIAM), and a past member of the Executive Committee of the American Physical Society's Division of Biological Physics.

Selected publications

References

External links
 Georgia Institute of Technology School of Physics
 "Making the Grade"---an article published in Newsweek by Wiesenfeld
 Self-organized criticality: An explanation of the 1/f noise

21st-century American physicists
Georgia Tech faculty
Fellows of the American Physical Society
Probability theorists
Living people
Year of birth missing (living people)